was a Japanese ukiyo-e artist. His last name was Hosoda (細田). His first name was Tokitomi (時富). His common name was Taminosuke (民之丞) and later Yasaburo (弥三郎). Pupil of Kano Eisen'in Michinobu (狩野 栄川院 典信). Born as the first son of direct vassal of the Shogunate, a well-off samurai family that was part of the Fujiwara clan. Eishi was a vassal of the Shogunate with a generous stipend of 500 'koku' (90,000 litres) of rice. Eishi left his employ with the Shōgun Ieharu to pursue art.  His early works were prints, mostly Bijin-ga portraits of tall, thin, graceful beauties in the original style established by himself akin to Kiyonaga and Utamaro. He established his own school and was a rival to Utamaro.  He was a prolific painter, and from 1801 gave up print designing to devote himself to painting.

Life and career

Eishi was born Hosoda Tokitomi in 1756 to a well-provided samurai family that was part of the prestigious Fujiwara clan.  His grandfather Hosoda Tokitoshi (細田 時敏) had held an influential position in the shogunate as Treasury Minister.  In 1772 he came to head his family when his father Hosoda Tokiyuki died.  From 1781 he held a position in the palace of the shōgun, Tokugawa Ieharu.

How Eishi took to art is unknown.  He appears to have studied under Kanō Michinobu of the Kanō school of painting, from whom he likely was given the art name Eishi—though tradition holds he received the name from Shōgun Ieharu.  About 1784 he left the official service of the Shōgun and began to train under Torii Bunryūsai, an ukiyo-e artist about whom almost nothing is known.  Eishi's earliest known work dates to the following year.  He remained unofficially in the Shōgun's service until 1789, and thereafter left his family in the hands of his adopted son Tokitoyo, thereby giving up his samurai rank; he reasoned that his ill health did not permit him to continue with such duties.

Eishi's earliest works were colour  prints.  The subjects are such literary fare as The Tale of Genji and are in subdued tones, as required by contemporary laws against ostentation.  He went on to specialize in  portraits of beautiful women, of which he produced a number of series.  His most prominent rival at first was Kiyonaga; later his work competed against that of Utamaro.  His manner of depicting women went through stages: the earliest were of courtesans much in the manner of Kiyonaga; then seated women performing daily activities such as reading or writing, set against bright backgrounds; later, slender women standing against minimal, subdued backgrounds.  Eishi depicted gradually taller and more slender women until, in the latest prints, their heads were one-twelfth the height of the figures; more so even than Kiyonaga, whose reputation is for tall, slender beauties.  Eishi made occasional illustrations for books of  erotica.  He was a prolific painter of such standing that in 1800 a painting of his entered the collection of the cloistered Empress Go-Sakuramachi and he was granted the honorary title Jibukyō.  Eishi abandoned print designing for painting after 1801.

He died in the seventh month of 1829 and was buried at Rengeji Temple. His Buddhist posthumous name is Kōsetsuin Denkaishin Eishi Nichizui Koji. He also used the personal names Min'nojō and Yasaburō.

Collections 
Modern Collections that feature Eishi's work:

 Art Gallery of Greater Victoria
 Art Gallery of New South Wales
 Art Institute of Chicago
 Asian Art Museum (San Francisco) 
 British Museum
 Cleveland Museum of Art
 Fine Arts Museums of San Francisco
 Finnish National Gallery
 Harvard Art Museums
 Hermitage Museum
 Indianapolis Museum of Art
Israel Museum, Jerusalem
 Lauren Rogers Museum of Art
 Los Angeles County Museum of Art
 Metropolitan Museum of Art
 Minneapolis Institute of Art
 Museum of Fine Arts, Boston
Nelson-Atkins Museum of Art
the Newark Museum of Art
 Norton Simon Museum
 Philadelphia Museum of Art
 San Diego Museum of Art
 San Francisco Museum of Modern Art
Suntory Museum of Art
 Tikotin Museum of Japanese Art
University of Michigan Museum of Art
Victoria and Albert Museum
 Weatherspoon Art Museum

Notes

References

Works cited

External links
 
 Chōbunsai Eishi at ukiyo-e.org

1756 births
1829 deaths
Ukiyo-e artists
18th-century Japanese artists
19th-century Japanese artists